Pleasant Hill Township is an inactive township in Cass County, in the U.S. state of Missouri.

Pleasant Hill Township was established in 1872, taking its name from Pleasant Hill, Missouri.

References

Townships in Missouri
Townships in Cass County, Missouri